Angelos Tsiaklis (born 2 October 1989) is a Cypriot footballer who plays as a midfielder. A product of the Manchester City youth team, he has played mostly in the Cypriot First Division.

Career

Tsiaklis came up through the Manchester City youth team to begin his career, where he won the FA Youth Cup.

In late October 2008, Tsiaklis was loaned out to Wrexham, originally for a month, which was extended for an extra month to last until 3 January 2009.

He signed for Wrexham permanently, however would only make one appearance as a permanent member of the squad.

He went on to play for Digenis Morphou, and made a brief return to the UK to play for FC United of Manchester.

He made appearances in the Cypriot First Division and Cypriot Second Division in the 2010s with Enosis and later with Olympiakos Nicosia.

References

1989 births
Living people
Cypriot footballers
Association football midfielders
Manchester City F.C. players
Wrexham A.F.C. players
Digenis Akritas Morphou FC players
F.C. United of Manchester players
Enosis Neon Paralimni FC players
Olympiakos Nicosia players
National League (English football) players